Mantisalca is a genus of flowering plants in the tribe Cardueae within the family Asteraceae.

Description

Annual or biennial herbs growing between 50 cm to 1.3 metres in size.  Herbage is not spiny.

Morphology

The stems are erect, strongly branched, longitudinal parallel lines (striate) with wings on stem absent.

Leaves grow around the base (basal) and along the stem (cauline). Leaves are without spines. Basal leaves dissected to the midrib with the leave segments merging (confluent) at the midrib (pinnatisect).  Stem leaves sparse, much reduced, very narrow in length with parallel sides (linear) and toothed, with the teeth pointing towards the leaf tip (serrate).

Flower heads are solitary with ray-florets absent and receptacle scales present. Involcural bracts are ovoid to spheric in shape, 10 to 15 mm in diameter. The bracts are in several series, up to eight in number, ending in a short deciduous spines or with a short sharp point (mucronate).

Distribution and habitat

Mantisalca occurs primarily in northern Africa, southern Europe and Turkey.  One species, Mantisalca salmantica, is naturalised in Australia.

Taxonomy

Etymology

Mantisalca is the anagram of the type species epithet salmantica.

Species
 Species
 Mantisalca amberboides (Caball.) Maire - Morocco
 Mantisalca cabezudoi 
 Mantisalca delestrii Briq. & Cavill. - Morocco, Algeria
 Mantisalca duriaei Briq. & Cavill. - France, Spain, Italy
 Mantisalca salmantica (L.) Briq. & Cavill. - widespread from Britain + Morocco to Palestine
 Mantisalca spinulosa 

Selected hybrids include:
 Mantisalca × castroviejoi

References

Bibliography

Cynareae
Asteraceae genera